Frobisher Lake is a lake in northern Saskatchewan, Canada, located between Turnor Lake and Churchill Lake.

Background 
The lake is part of the Churchill River drainage basin. It receives water from Turnor Lake via the short Wanasin River and a channel connects it to Churchill Lake. Pinaskau, Wapiskaw and Waskwei are the largest of many islands on the lake. The freezing period of the lake is from November to May. There are no permanent settlements on Frobisher Lake. The closest community is Turnor Lake, which is accessed by Highway 909. From Turnor Lake a road access was built to Frobisher Lake.

The lake's fish species include: walleye, sauger, yellow perch, northern pike, lake trout, lake whitefish, cisco, white sucker, longnose sucker and burbot.

See also
List of lakes of Saskatchewan

References

Lakes of Saskatchewan